Goldie is a surname. Notable people with the surname include:

Alanna Goldie (born 1994), Canadian fencer
Alexander Goldie (1896–1918), Scottish footballer
Alfred Goldie (1920–2005), English mathematician
Annabel Goldie (born 1950), Scottish politician
Archie Goldie (1874–1953), Scottish footballer
C. F. Goldie (1870–1947), New Zealand artist famous for his paintings of early Maori
Charles Goldie (cricketer) (1826–1886), English clergyman and cricketer, father of John
Dan Goldie (born 1963), American tennis player
David Goldie (politician) (1842–1926), Mayor of Auckland City and Member of Parliament in New Zealand, father of C. F. Goldie
David Goldie (priest) (1946–2002), priest in the Church of England
Edward Goldie (1856–1921), English ecclesiastical architect, son of George Goldie
George Goldie (architect) (1828–1887), English ecclesiastical architect
George Taubman Goldie (1846–1925), European explorer
Grace Wyndham Goldie (1900–1986), BBC producer
Jim Goldie (born 1940), Scottish professional footballer
John Goldie (1849–1896), British rower
John Goldie (botanist) (1793–1886), Scottish-born botanist
John Francis Goldie (1870 – 1955) Methodist missionary
Malcolm Goldie (1883–?), Scottish footballer, coach at the Massachusetts Institute of Technology
Michael Goldie (1932–2013), British actor
Noel Goldie (1882–1964), British Member of Parliament
Peter Goldie (1946–2011), British philosopher 
Rosemary Goldie (1916–2010), Australian Catholic theologian
William Goldie (1878–1952), Scottish footballer, brother of Archie